Henderson Field  is a public airport located on Sand Island in Midway Atoll, an unincorporated territory of the United States. The airport is used as an emergency diversion point for ETOPS operations. It is one of three airfields named after Major Lofton R. Henderson (killed in the Battle of Midway during WWII), together with Henderson Field on Midway's Eastern Island, and Henderson Field in the Solomon Islands. The airfield now provides access to Midway Atoll National Wildlife Refuge.

The airfield operated until 1993 as Naval Air Facility Midway. Its construction was begun by Seabees of the 1st Naval Construction Battalion in July 1942 as a bomber strip. After transition from the U.S. Navy to the Department of the Interior, the airport was subsidized by Boeing until 2004. Since 2004, the U.S. Fish and Wildlife Service has fully supported airport operations and maintenance with some assistance from the Federal Aviation Administration.

Henderson Field has no control tower. From November to June,  when albatross are typically present, flight arrivals and departures are limited to night-time. (Midway Atoll NWR is the world's largest nesting albatross colony.)

Past airline service

During the early 1950s, the airfield was used as a technical stop by Pan American World Airways (Pan Am) for its Boeing 377 Stratocruiser propliners as part of Pan Am's round the world service from New York City to San Francisco via London, Frankfurt, Delhi, Bangkok, Hong Kong, Guam, Honolulu and other en route stops.

The airfield was previously served by Aloha Airlines with scheduled weekly charter flights to and from Honolulu using a Boeing 737-200 jetliner.  In early 2000, Aloha began scheduled 737 passenger service between Midway Island and Honolulu.

Continental Micronesia served Midway with Boeing 727-100 jetliners during the early 1970s although the airport was only used as an "operational stop" on this airline's westbound service from Honolulu to Guam. The routing of these 727 flights was Honolulu - Midway Island - Kwajalein - Majuro - Ponape - Truk - Guam.

Facilities 

Accidents and incidents 
On January 7, 2004, a Continental Flight 6, a Boeing 777 from Tokyo Narita Airport to Houston Intercontinental Airport carrying 294 people made an emergency landing at 03:10 local time at Midway Henderson Field due to losing an engine after suffering an oil leak from a starter. Continental flew in a Learjet with a maintenance crew of four, a new starter and additional food and water supplies for passengers to Midway.
On June 17, 2011, a Delta Air Lines Boeing 747-400 with 359 passengers and 19 crew made an emergency landing on Henderson, due to the captain's windshield having cracked. During the landing at Midway, the plane hit two birds, one of which damaged a wing flap.
On July 11, 2014, United Airlines Flight 201 from Honolulu to Guam made an emergency landing at Henderson Field after an "electrical odor" was detected in the cabin. An investigation revealed that an equipment supply cooling fan had malfunctioned.
On April 16, 2021, United Airlines Flight 2781 made an emergency landing at Henderson Field after smoke/odor smell in the cockpit (reported in ACARS messages). The flight departed Guam, and was on its way to Los Angeles, operated with a Boeing 787-9, registration number N24974. This flight carried only cargo.
On September 25, 2021, a Hawaiian Airlines A330 (N396HA) experienced an in-flight engine shut down and diverted to Midway Atoll. The aircraft was en route from Seoul (ICN) to Honolulu (HNL).

See also
Battle for Henderson Field (1942 Battle for Guadalcanal, a different Henderson Field)

References

External links 

AirNav - Henderson Field Airport: airport facilities and navigational aids

Airports in the United States Minor Outlying Islands
Midway Atoll